The Kresta II class, Soviet designation Project 1134A Berkut A (golden eagle), was a class of guided missile cruiser (large anti-submarine warfare ship in Soviet classification) built by the Soviet Union for the Soviet Navy. The NATO lists the class as "cruisers" mainly due to the Metel (SS-N-14 Silex) anti-ship missile system capable to strike not only submarines but also surface vessels.

Design
Conway's states that the first three ships were to have been armed with the SS-N-9 anti-ship missile but Soviet naval doctrine changed with greater emphasis on anti-submarine warfare. The surface-to-air missiles comprised more advanced SA-N-3 missiles with two twin launchers. New 3D search radar and new fire control radars were also fitted. 4 30mm CIWS guns were also fitted for improved anti-missile defence. A more advanced sonar led to the bow being more sharply raked. The machinery suite comprised two TV-12 steam turbines with high-pressure boilers, identical to the Kresta I class.

General characteristics
They displaced 6000 tons standard and 7800 full load. They had a complement of 380-400 and were equipped with a hangar aft to stow away a Kamov Ka-25 Hormone-A helicopter.

Kresta II-class vessels were propelled by two TV-12 steam geared turbines powered by four high pressure boilers which created .

Armament
For their primary role as anti-submarine cruisers, the Kresta II class mounted two quadruple launchers for eight SS-N-14 anti-submarine missiles. They were also equipped with two RBU 6000 12-barrel and two RBU 1000 6-barrel rocket launchers. The Ka-25 helicopter embarked on the cruiser was also capable of aiding in the search and destruction of submarines.

Against aerial threats the cruisers were armed with four 57mm L/80 DP guns situated in two twin mountings. They also had four 30mm AK-630 CIWS mountings. They were armed with two twin launchers for the 48 SA-N-3 surface-to-air missiles they carried.

The ships also mounted two quintuple mountings for  dual-role torpedoes.

Sensors
The Kresta II class were equipped with MR600 air search radar MR-310 Angara Don navigational and Volga navigational radars. For anti-submarine warfare they had MG-322 hull mounted sonar. For fire control purposes they had Grom SA-N-1 fire control, MR103 AK725 fire control and Drakon RP33 fire control. They also had a MG-26 communications outfit and a MG-35 Shtil.

The first four ships of the class to be completed were not equipped with the MR-123 Vympel fire control radar for the AK-630, and relied on manual targeting instead.

Ships
All the ships were built by the Zhdanov Shipyard in Leningrad.

See also
List of ships of the Soviet Navy
List of ships of Russia by project number

Notes

References

 
  Also published as

External links
 Kresta Class - Project 1134 at Federation of American Scientists website
 article in Russian
  [article in Russian]
 All Russian Kresta II Class Cruisers - Complete Ship List

Cruiser classes
 
Ships of the Soviet Navy
Ship classes of the Russian Navy